The Victory Bell is the trophy that is awarded to the winner of the UCLA–USC football rivalry game. The game is an American college football rivalry between the UCLA Bruins and USC Trojans, part of the overall UCLA–USC rivalry.

The Victory Bell is a  brass bell that originally rang atop a Southern Pacific railroad locomotive. It is currently mounted on a special wheeled carriage.

History
The bell was given to the UCLA student body in 1939 as a gift from the school's alumni association. Initially, the UCLA cheerleaders rang the bell after each Bruin point. However, during the opening game of UCLA's 1941 season (through 1981, both schools used the Los Angeles Memorial Coliseum for home games), six members of USC's Trojan Knights (who were also members of the SigEp fraternity) infiltrated the Bruin rooting section, assisted in loading the bell aboard a truck headed back to Westwood, took the key to the truck, and escaped with the bell while UCLA's actual handlers went to find a replacement key. The bell remained hidden from UCLA students for more than a year, first in SigEp’s basement, then in the Hollywood Hills, Santa Ana, and other locations. At one point, it was even concealed beneath a haystack. Bruin students tried to locate the bell, but to no avail. A picture of the bell appeared in a USC periodical. Tension between UCLA and USC students rose as each started to play even more elaborate and disruptive pranks on the other. When the conflict caused the USC president to threaten to cancel the rivalry, a compromise was met: on November 12, 1942, the student body presidents of both schools, in front of Tommy Trojan, signed the agreement that the bell would be the trophy for the game.

The winner of the annual football game keeps the Victory Bell for the next year, and paints it the school's color: blue for UCLA or cardinal for USC.

Team traditions

UCLA

When the bell is in UCLA's possession, the carriage is sandblasted and painted "True Blue." While in the possession of UCLA, the bell is safeguarded by the UCLA Rally Committee. During UCLA home games at the Rose Bowl and whenever UCLA faces USC at the L.A. Coliseum, it resides on the field in front of the student section. It is rung by members of the Rally Committee after each score. The Bruins also ring the bell using a rope attached to the handle, swinging the whole bell, as opposed to the Trojan style of attaching a rope to the tongue or clapper on the inside of the bell. The bell also makes special appearances at rallies and athletic events. It has been used to accompany the UCLA Band during halftime shows. In particular the bell will make an appearance at a major gathering if the bell returns to UCLA.

USC

Before home games, when the bell is in USC's possession, it sits along Trousdale Parkway for fans to ring as they participate in the "Trojan Walk" to the L.A. Coliseum. During home games, and whenever USC faces UCLA at the Rose Bowl, the Victory Bell is displayed at the edge of the field for the first three quarters of the game. Members of the Trojan Knights ring the bell every time the Trojans score. The carriage is painted cardinal red.

Series record
The first victory for UCLA in the series occurred after the agreement over the Victory Bell, making the Bruins the first winner of the trophy. The Bruins made their post-season appearance after the 1942 season in the Rose Bowl. The teams played each other twice in the same season in 1943, 1944, and 1945, due to travel restrictions during World War II; of those six, USC won five and tied the other.

UCLA took the bell back following the 38–28 victory over USC on November 17, 2012. The Victory Bell was held by USC during the 1999–2005 and 2007–2011 football seasons. Before the streak of seven Trojan wins, the Bruins had won the bell for the eight consecutive years from 1991–1998, the longest streak in the rivalry. There have been seven ties and one overtime game (1996, 2OT) in the history of the series. In the event of a tie, the Victory Bell was retained by the last winner. With the institution of the overtime rule in FBS in 1996, the tie rule became obsolete.

Game results
From 1929 until 1981, the two teams played in the Los Angeles Memorial Coliseum; the Rose Bowl became UCLA's home field in 1982.

See also
UCLA–USC rivalry
Southern California Crosstown Cup
Victory Bell (disambiguation) – Other trophies also called the "Victory Bell"
Jeweled Shillelagh
1967 UCLA vs. USC football game
List of NCAA college football rivalry games

References

College football rivalry trophies in the United States
UCLA Bruins football
USC Trojans football
1929 establishments in California